Results from Norwegian football in 2002.

Men's football

League season

Tippeligaen

Play-offs
November 2: Sandefjord – Brann 0–0

November 6: Brann – Sandefjord 2–1 (agg. 2–1)

Brann stay up.

1. divisjon

2. divisjon

3. divisjon

Norwegian Cup

Final

Women's football

League season

Toppserien

1. divisjon
 1. Liungen 16 14 1 1 71–14 43 Promoted
 2. Fløya 16 9 2 5 27–17 29 Promoted
 -------------------------------------
 3. Skeid 16 8 5 3 31–22 29
 4. Haugar 16 8 0 8 31–31 24
 5. Medkila 16 6 3 7 34–24 21
 6. Fortuna 16 6 2 8 21–28 20
 7. Nittedal 16 6 2 8 22–38 20 (ex Gjelleråsen)
 8. Vålerenga 16 5 3 8 22–32 18
 -------------------------------------
 9. Follese 16 1 0 15 11–64 3 Relegated
 Athene Moss withdrew before the season because of financial problems.

Norwegian Women's Cup

Final
Trondheims-Ørn 4–3 (a.e.t.) Arna-Bjørnar

Men's UEFA competitions
Norwegian representatives:
Rosenborg (UEFA Champions League)
Lillestrøm (UEFA Champions League)
Viking (UEFA Cup, cup winner)
Stabæk (UEFA Cup)
Brann (UEFA Cup, fair play)

Champions League

Qualifying rounds

Second qualifying round

|}

Third qualifying round

|}

Champions League, Phase 1

Group D

Matches
September 17: Rosenborg – Inter (Italy) 2–2
September 25: Lyon (France) – Rosenborg 5–0
October 2: Rosenborg – Ajax (Netherlands) 0–0
October 22: Ajax – Rosenborg 1–1
October 30: Inter – Rosenborg 3–0
November 12: Rosenborg – Lyon 1–1

UEFA Cup

Preliminary round
August 15: Brann – Suduva Marijampole (Lithuania) 2–3
Stabæk – Linfield (Northern Ireland) 4–0

August 29: Linfield – Stabæk 1–1 (agg. 1–5)
Suduva Marijampole – Brann 3–2 (agg. 6–4)

First round
September 19: Anderlecht (Belgium) – Stabæk 0–1
Chelsea (England) – Viking 2–1

October 3: Stabæk – Anderlecht 1–2 (agg. 2–2, Anderlecht on away goals)
Viking – Chelsea 4–2 (agg. 5–4)

Second round
October 31: Celta (Spain) – Viking 3–0

November 14: Viking – Celta 1–1 (agg. 1–4)

Intertoto Cup

No Norwegian representative this season.

UEFA Women's Cup

Second qualifying round

Group 5

Matches
(in Saloniki)
 September 25: Trondheims/Ørn – Saestum (Netherlands) 2–0
 September 27: Trondheims/Ørn – PAOK Saloniki (Greece) 12–0
 September 29: Regal București (Romania) – Trondheims/Ørn 0–4

Quarter-finals

|}

National teams

Norway men's national football team

Note: Norway's goals first 
Explanation:
F = Friendly
ECQ = Euro 2004 Qualifier

Norway women's national football team

January 23: Norway – United States 1–0, friendly

 
January 25: China – Norway 0–3, friendly

 
January 27: Norway – Germany 1–3, friendly

 
March 1: Norway – England 3–1, friendly

 
March 3: Norway – Sweden 3–3, friendly

 
March 5: Norway – United States 3–2, friendly

 
March 7: Norway – China 0–1, friendly

 
March 24: Czech Republic – Norway 1–5, World Cup qualifier

 
May 9: Norway – France 3–1, World Cup qualifier

 
May 12: Ukraine – Norway 1–1, World Cup qualifier

 
July 17: Canada – Norway 2–2, friendly

 
July 21: United States – Norway 4–0, friendly

 
September 14: Norway – Germany 1–3, friendly

References

 
Seasons in Norwegian football